Francis Maurice Martin (30 June 1895 – 23 February 1969) was an Australian rules footballer who played with Carlton in the Victorian Football League (VFL).

Notes

External links 

	
Frank Martin's profile at Blueseum

1895 births
1969 deaths
Australian rules footballers from Victoria (Australia)
Australian Rules footballers: place kick exponents
Carlton Football Club players